In mathematics, especially in abstract algebra, a quasigroup is an algebraic structure resembling a group in the sense that "division" is always possible. Quasigroups differ from groups mainly in that they need not be associative and need not have an identity element.

A quasigroup with an identity element is called a loop.

Definitions 

There are at least two structurally equivalent formal definitions of quasigroup. One defines a quasigroup as a set with one binary operation, and the other, from universal algebra, defines a quasigroup as having three primitive operations. The homomorphic image of a quasigroup defined with a single binary operation, however, need not be a quasigroup. We begin with the first definition.

Algebra
A quasigroup  is a non-empty set Q with a binary operation ∗ (that is, a magma, indicating that a quasigroup has to satisfy closure property), obeying the Latin square property. This states that, for each a and b in Q, there exist unique elements x and y in Q such that both
a ∗ x = b,
y ∗ a = b 
hold.  (In other words: Each element of the set occurs exactly once in each row and exactly once in each column of the quasigroup's multiplication table, or Cayley table. This property ensures that the Cayley table of a finite quasigroup, and, in particular, finite group, is a Latin square.)  The requirement that x and y be unique can be replaced by the requirement that the magma be cancellative.

The operations '\' and '/' are called, respectively, left division and right division. With regard to the Cayley table, the first equation (left division) means that the b entry in the a row marks the x column while the second equation (right division) means that the b entry in the a column marks the y row.

The empty set equipped with the empty binary operation satisfies this definition of a quasigroup.  Some authors accept the empty quasigroup but others explicitly exclude it.

Universal algebra
Given some algebraic structure, an identity is an equation in which all variables are tacitly universally quantified, and in which all operations are among the primitive operations proper to the structure. Algebraic structures that satisfy axioms that are given solely by identities are called a variety. Many standard results in universal algebra hold only for varieties. Quasigroups form a variety if left and right division are taken as primitive.

A quasigroup  is a type (2,2,2) algebra (i.e., equipped with three binary operations) satisfying the identities:
y = x ∗ (x \ y),
y = x \ (x ∗ y),
y = (y / x) ∗ x,
y = (y ∗ x) / x.

In other words: Multiplication and division in either order, one after the other, on the same side by the same element, have no net effect.

Hence if  is a quasigroup according to the first definition, then  is the same quasigroup in the sense of universal algebra. And vice versa: if  is a quasigroup according to the sense of universal algebra, then  is a quasigroup according to the first definition.

Loops

A loop is a quasigroup with an identity element; that is, an element, e, such that
x ∗ e = x and e ∗ x = x for all x in Q.

It follows that the identity element, e, is unique, and that every element of Q has unique left and right inverses (which need not be the same).

A quasigroup with an idempotent element is called a pique ("pointed idempotent quasigroup"); this is a weaker notion than a loop but common nonetheless because, for example, given an abelian group, taking its subtraction operation as quasigroup multiplication yields a pique  with the group identity (zero) turned into a "pointed idempotent".  (That is, there is a principal isotopy .)

A loop that is associative is a group. A group can have a non-associative pique isotope, but it cannot have a nonassociative loop isotope.

There are weaker associativity properties that have been given special names.

For instance, a Bol loop is a loop that satisfies  either:
x ∗ (y ∗ (x ∗ z)) = (x ∗ (y ∗ x)) ∗ z for each x, y and z in Q (a left Bol loop),
or else
((z ∗ x) ∗ y) ∗ x = z ∗ ((x ∗ y) ∗ x) for each x, y and z in Q (a right Bol loop).

A loop that is both a left and right Bol loop is a Moufang loop.  This is equivalent to any one of the following single Moufang identities holding for all x, y, z:
x ∗ (y ∗ (x ∗ z)) = ((x ∗ y) ∗ x) ∗ z,
z ∗ (x ∗ (y ∗ x)) = ((z ∗ x) ∗ y) ∗ x,
(x ∗ y) ∗ (z ∗ x) = x ∗ ((y ∗ z) ∗ x), or
(x ∗ y) ∗ (z ∗ x) = (x ∗ (y ∗ z)) ∗ x.

Symmetries 
 names the following important properties and subclasses:

Semisymmetry 
A quasigroup is semisymmetric if the following equivalent identities hold:
x ∗ y = y / x,
y ∗ x = x \ y,
x = (y ∗ x) ∗ y,
x = y ∗ (x ∗ y).

Although this class may seem special, every quasigroup Q induces a semisymmetric quasigroup QΔ on the direct product cube Q3 via the following operation:

Triality

Total symmetry 
A narrower class is a totally symmetric quasigroup (sometimes abbreviated TS-quasigroup) in which all conjugates coincide as one operation: . Another way to define (the same notion of) totally symmetric quasigroup is as a semisymmetric quasigroup which also is commutative, i.e. .

Idempotent total symmetric quasigroups are precisely (i.e. in a bijection with) Steiner triples, so such a quasigroup is also called a Steiner quasigroup, and sometimes the latter is even abbreviated as squag. Without idempotency, total symmetric quasigroups correspond to the geometric notion of extended Steiner triple, also called Generalized Elliptic Cubic Curve (GECC).

Total antisymmetry
A quasigroup  is called totally anti-symmetric if for all , both of the following implications hold:
 (c ∗ x) ∗ y = (c ∗ y) ∗ x implies that x = y
 x ∗ y = y ∗ x implies that x = y.

It is called weakly totally anti-symmetric if only the first implication holds.

This property is required, for example, in the Damm algorithm.

Examples 

 Every group is a loop, because  if and only if , and  if and only if .
 The integers Z (or the rationals Q or the reals R) with subtraction (−) form a quasigroup. These quasiqroups are not loops because there is no identity element (0 is a right identity because , but not a left identity because, in general).
 The nonzero rationals Q× (or the nonzero reals R×) with division (÷) form a quasigroup.
 Any vector space over a field of characteristic not equal to 2 forms an idempotent, commutative quasigroup under the operation .
 Every Steiner triple system defines an idempotent, commutative quasigroup:  is the third element of the triple containing a and b. These quasigroups also satisfy  for all x and y in the quasigroup. These quasigroups are known as Steiner quasigroups.
 The set  where  and with all other products as in the quaternion group forms a nonassociative loop of order 8. See hyperbolic quaternions for its application. (The hyperbolic quaternions themselves do not form a loop or quasigroup.)
 The nonzero octonions form a nonassociative loop under multiplication. The octonions are a special type of loop known as a Moufang loop.
 An associative quasigroup is either empty or is a group, since if there is at least one element, the invertibility of the quasigroup binary operation combined with associativity implies the existence of an identity element which then implies the existence of inverse elements, thus satisfying all three requirements of a group.
 The following construction is due to Hans Zassenhaus. On the underlying set of the four-dimensional vector space F4 over the 3-element Galois field  define
(x1, x2, x3, x4) ∗ (y1, y2, y3, y4) = (x1, x2, x3, x4) + (y1, y2, y3, y4) + (0, 0, 0, (x3 − y3)(x1y2 − x2y1)).
Then,  is a commutative Moufang loop that is not a group.
 More generally, the nonzero elements of any division algebra form a quasigroup.

Properties 
In the remainder of the article we shall denote quasigroup multiplication simply by juxtaposition.

Quasigroups have the cancellation property: if , then . This follows from the uniqueness of left division of ab or ac by a. Similarly, if , then .

Multiplication operators

The definition of a quasigroup can be treated as conditions on the left and right multiplication operators , defined by 

The definition says that both mappings are bijections from Q to itself. A magma Q is a quasigroup precisely when all these operators, for every x in Q, are bijective. The inverse mappings are left and right division, that is, 

In this notation the identities among the quasigroup's multiplication and division operations (stated in the section on universal algebra)  are

where 1 denotes the identity mapping on Q.

Latin squares

The multiplication table of a finite quasigroup is a Latin square: an  table filled with n different symbols in such a way that each symbol occurs exactly once in each row and exactly once in each column.

Conversely, every Latin square can be taken as the multiplication table of a quasigroup in many ways: the border row (containing the column headers) and the border column (containing the row headers) can each be any permutation of the elements. See small Latin squares and quasigroups.

Infinite quasigroups
For a countably infinite quasigroup Q, it is possible to imagine an infinite array in which every row and every column corresponds to some element q of Q, and where the element  is in the row corresponding to a and the column responding to b. In this situation too, the Latin square property says that each row and each column of the infinite array will contain every possible value precisely once.

For an uncountably infinite quasigroup, such as the group of non-zero real numbers under multiplication, the Latin square property still holds, although the name is somewhat unsatisfactory, as it is not possible to produce the array of combinations to which the above idea of an infinite array extends since the real numbers cannot all be written in a sequence. (This is somewhat misleading however, as the reals can be written in a sequence of length , assuming the well-ordering theorem.)

Inverse properties

Every loop element has a unique left and right inverse given by

A loop is said to have (two-sided) inverses if  for all x.

There are some stronger notions of inverses in loops which are often useful:
A loop has the antiautomorphic inverse property if  or, equivalently, if .
A loop has the weak inverse property when  if and only if . This may be stated in terms of inverses via  or equivalently .

A loop has the inverse property if it has both the left and right inverse properties. Inverse property loops also have the antiautomorphic and weak inverse properties. In fact, any loop which satisfies any two of the above four identities has the inverse property and therefore satisfies all four.

Any loop which satisfies the left, right, or antiautomorphic inverse properties automatically has two-sided inverses.

Morphisms

A quasigroup or loop homomorphism is a map  between two quasigroups such that . Quasigroup homomorphisms necessarily preserve left and right division, as well as identity elements (if they exist).

Homotopy and isotopy

Let Q and P be quasigroups. A quasigroup homotopy from Q to P is a triple  of maps from Q to P such that

for all x, y in Q. A quasigroup homomorphism is just a homotopy for which the three maps are equal.

An isotopy is a homotopy for which each of the three maps  is a bijection. Two quasigroups are isotopic if there is an isotopy between them. In terms of Latin squares, an isotopy  is given by a permutation of rows α, a permutation of columns β, and a permutation on the underlying element set γ.

An autotopy is an isotopy from a quasigroup to itself. The set of all autotopies of a quasigroup form a group with the automorphism group as a subgroup.

Every quasigroup is isotopic to a loop. If a loop is isotopic to a group, then it is isomorphic to that group and thus is itself a group. However, a quasigroup which is isotopic to a group need not be a group. Every medial quasigroup is isotopic to an abelian group by the Bruck–Toyoda theorem.

Conjugation (parastrophe)

Left and right division are examples of forming a quasigroup by permuting the variables in the defining equation. From the original operation ∗ (i.e.) we can form five new operations:  (the opposite operation), / and \, and their opposites.  That makes a total of six quasigroup operations, which are called the conjugates or parastrophes of ∗.   Any two of these operations are said to be "conjugate" or "parastrophic" to each other (and to themselves).

Isostrophe (paratopy)

If the set Q has two quasigroup operations, ∗ and ·, and one of them is isotopic to a conjugate of the other, the operations are said to be isostrophic to each other.  There are also many other names for this relation of "isostrophe", e.g., paratopy.

Generalizations

Polyadic or multiary quasigroups 

Polyadic or multiary means n-ary for some nonnegative integer n.

A 0-ary, or nullary, quasigroup is just a constant element of Q.  A 1-ary, or unary, quasigroup is a bijection of Q to itself.  A binary, or 2-ary, quasigroup is an ordinary quasigroup.

An example of a multiary quasigroup is an iterated group operation, ; it is not necessary to use parentheses to specify the order of operations because the group is associative.  One can also form a multiary quasigroup by carrying out any sequence of the same or different group or quasigroup operations, if the order of operations is specified.

There exist multiary quasigroups that cannot be represented in any of these ways.  An n-ary quasigroup is irreducible if its operation cannot be factored into the composition of two operations in the following way:

Finite irreducible n-ary quasigroups exist for all ; see Akivis and Goldberg (2001) for details.

An n-ary quasigroup with an n-ary version of associativity is called an n-ary group.

Right- and left-quasigroups 

A right-quasigroup  is a type (2,2) algebra satisfying both identities:
y = (y / x) ∗ x;
y = (y ∗ x) / x.

Similarly, a left-quasigroup  is a type (2,2) algebra satisfying both identities:
y = x ∗ (x \ y);
y = x \ (x ∗ y).

Number of small quasigroups and loops 

The number of isomorphism classes of small quasigroups  and loops  is given here:

See also 
Division ring – a ring in which every non-zero element has a multiplicative inverse
Semigroup – an algebraic structure consisting of a set together with an associative binary operation
Monoid – a semigroup with an identity element
Planar ternary ring – has an additive and multiplicative loop structure
Problems in loop theory and quasigroup theory
Mathematics of Sudoku

Notes

References

External links
 quasigroups
 

Non-associative algebra
Group theory
Latin squares